Shahdara Bagh (meaning “King’s Way Garden”) is a historic precinct located across the Ravi River from the Walled City of Lahore in Punjab, Pakistan. Shahdara Bagh is the site of several Mughal era monumentally, including the Tomb of Jahangir, the Akbari Sarai, Tomb of Asif Khan and Baradari of Kamran Mirza.

History

Shahdra can be translated as the door of kings and also known as "the way of kings". Shah translates as "king" and dra translates as the way. In the 15th century, Shahdra was the entrance gate of Lahore under the Mughal Empire. It hosts several historic Mughal architectural sites.  These include the Akbari Sarai, the Tomb of Jahangir (who was the Emperor from 1605 to 1627) and the tomb of his brother-in-law Asif Khan. Shahdara Bagh is also home to Kamran's Baradari (Kamran Ki Baradari).  Although this site was originally built on the Ravi River bank, the river changed course, covering the site near the Ravi Bridge.
The small garden houses the tomb of Mughal Princess Dohita Un Nissa Begum (1651-1697).

Transportation
Shahdara Bagh railway station serves Shahdara and surrounding areas. Shahdara Metrobus Terminal Station is located on the north bank of river Ravi
.

Gallery

See also 
 List of parks and gardens in Lahore
 List of parks and gardens in Pakistan
 List of parks and gardens in Karachi
Tomb of Asif Khan
Tomb of Jahangir
Tomb of Muhammad Iqbal
Tomb of Nur Jahan

References

Ravi Zone
Mughal gardens in Pakistan
Mughal tombs